Tang Dalan (also Romanized as Tang Dālān and Tang-e Dālān; also known as Pas Par Dālān) is a village in Kohurestan Rural District, in the Central District of Khamir County, Hormozgan Province, Iran. At the 2006 census, its population was 183, in 38 families.

References 

Populated places in Khamir County